John O'Brien (February 20, 1847 – October 20, 1917) was a Canadian merchant and politician in New Brunswick, Canada. He represented Northumberland County in the Legislative Assembly of New Brunswick from 1890 to 1903 as a Liberal-Conservative.

He was born in Nelson-Miramichi, New Brunswick, the son of John O'Brien and Mary Alward, both Irish immigrants, and was educated there. In 1890, he married Lillie McPeake. O'Brien was involved in the lumber trade. He served on the county council and was county warden. O'Brien also served as vice-president of the local Agricultural Society.

References 
The Canadian parliamentary companion, 1897 JA Gemmill
The Irish In Early New Brunswick, Irish Canadian Cultural Association of New Brunswick

1847 births
1917 deaths
Progressive Conservative Party of New Brunswick MLAs